The Camel News Caravan or Camel Caravan of News was a 15-minute American television news program aired by NBC News from February 16, 1949 to October 26, 1956. Sponsored by the Camel cigarette brand and anchored by John Cameron Swayze, it was the first NBC news program to use NBC filmed news stories rather than movie newsreels. On February 16, 1954, the Camel News Caravan became the first news program broadcast in color, making use of 16mm color film. In early 1955, the R.J. Reynolds Tobacco Company, maker of Camel cigarettes, cut back its sponsorship to three days a week. Chrysler's Plymouth division sponsored the other days, and on those days, the program was labelled the Plymouth News Caravan. The program featured a young Washington correspondent named David Brinkley, and competed against Douglas Edwards with the News on rival CBS. With greater resources, the News Caravan attracted a larger audience than its CBS competition until 1955.

Launched on February 16, 1948, by NBC as NBC Television Newsreel, and later Camel Newsreel Theatre it began as a 10-minute program that featured Fox Movietone News newsreels.  John Cameron Swayze provided voice-over for the series.  The Camel News Caravan was an expanded version of the Camel Newsreel Theatre and featured Swayze on-camera.  It was also known as  the Camel Caravan of News.

The Camel News Caravan was replaced by the Huntley-Brinkley Report on October 29, 1956. President Dwight D. Eisenhower had word passed to NBC's White House correspondent that the president was displeased by the switch. In late 1961 and early 1962, Swayze served as one of three anchors of ABC News's evening news program but became best-known for his appearances in commercials for Timex watches.

Notes

External links
 Camel News Caravan at IMDB
 60 Years of Nightly News on NBC

NBC original programming
1948 American television series debuts
1956 American television series endings
1940s American television news shows
1950s American television news shows
NBC News
Black-and-white American television shows
English-language television shows
R. J. Reynolds Tobacco Company